Alicia Sable is an American actress. She is known for playing Tammy Stackhouse in the Amazon television series Alpha House (2013–14), and Goldie Page in the film The Notorious Bettie Page (2005).

Biography
Sable was born in Giles County, Virginia, the daughter of Gail Sable, a kindergarten teacher, and David Sable, director of Special Education and Testing for the Radford City Schools; she is married to Dr. Peter Ehren Sterbutzel.  She has a music degree from Radford University.

Filmography

Film

Television

References

External links
 
 

Living people
Actresses from Virginia
American film actresses
American stage actresses
American television actresses
People from Giles County, Virginia
Year of birth missing (living people)
21st-century American women